The 2008 Whyte & Mackay Premier League was a darts tournament organised by the Professional Darts Corporation. The prize money was increased by £75,000 compared to 2007. The overall fund was £340,000 with the eventual winner taking home £100,000.

Phil Taylor continued his dominance of this tournament by taking the title for the fourth year in a row despite losing for the first time in 44 matches, losing the opening game 8–6 to newcomer James Wade and going on to lose twice more in his first four matches. Taylor beat Wade 16–8 in the final.

Sky Sports secured television coverage of the event until 2010, and Whyte & Mackay sponsored the tournament for the same duration – taking over from Holsten who sponsored the event in 2006 and 2007.

Qualifiers 
The World Grand Prix in October 2007 was the cut-off point for automatic qualification for the event. The top six players in the World Rankings after the tournament received an automatic place in the Premier League. The qualifiers were thus:

  Phil Taylor
  Raymond van Barneveld
  James Wade
  Terry Jenkins
  Peter Manley
  Adrian Lewis
  John Part (PDC wildcard)
  Wayne Mardle (Sky Sports wildcard)

Venues
Fifteen venues were used for the 2008 Premier League, including a first trip to Northern Ireland for a night in Belfast.

Prize money 
The prize fund increases for 2008 – with the top prize of £100,000 matching the amount that the 2008 PDC World Champion received. The guaranteed prize for reaching the Premier League is now £20,000.

Results

League stage

31 January – week 1 
 SECC, Glasgow

7 February – week 2 
 Plymouth Pavilions, Plymouth

14 February – week 3 
 MEN Arena, Manchester

21 February – Week 4 
 Ricoh Arena, Coventry

28 February – Week 5 
 Bournemouth International Centre, Bournemouth

6 March – Week 6 
 Trent FM Arena, Nottingham

13 March – Week 7 
 Sheffield Arena, Sheffield

20 March – Week 8 
 Brighton Centre, Brighton

27 March – Week 9 
 National Indoor Arena, Birmingham

† = Terry Jenkins replaced Adrian Lewis on 27 March show against Phil Taylor because Lewis was too ill to play. The next week, Lewis played his match against Taylor and James Wade, giving Jenkins the night off.

3 April – week 10 
 AECC, Aberdeen

10 April – week 11 
 Echo Arena, Liverpool

17 April – week 12 
 Wembley Arena, London

24 April – week 13 
 Odyssey Arena, Belfast

1 May – week 14 
 Metro Radio Arena, Newcastle upon Tyne

Play-offs – 26 May 
 Cardiff International Arena, Cardiff

Table and Streaks

Table 

NB: LWAT = Legs Won Against Throw. Players separated by +/- leg difference if tied.

Streaks 

NB: W = Won
D = Drawn
L = Lost
N/A = Did Not Play

Player statistics 
The following statistics are for the league stage only. Playoffs are not included.

Phil Taylor 
 Longest unbeaten run: 10
 Most consecutive wins: 5
 Most consecutive draws: 1
 Most consecutive losses: 2
 Longest without a win: 2
 Biggest victory: 8-0 (v. Wayne Mardle)
 Biggest defeat: 3-8 (v. Peter Manley)

James Wade 
 Longest unbeaten run: 4
 Most consecutive wins: 4
 Most consecutive draws: 1
 Most consecutive losses: 1
 Longest without a win: 2
 Biggest victory: 8-1 (v. Adrian Lewis)
 Biggest defeat: 4-8 (v. Phil Taylor)

Raymond van Barneveld 
 Longest unbeaten run: 3
 Most consecutive wins: 3
 Most consecutive draws: 0
 Most consecutive losses: 2
 Longest without a win: 2
 Biggest victory: 8-1 (v. Terry Jenkins)
 Biggest defeat: 2-8 (v. Phil Taylor)

Adrian Lewis 
 Longest unbeaten run: 3
 Most consecutive wins: 1
 Most consecutive draws: 2
 Most consecutive losses: 2
 Longest without a win: 3
 Biggest victory: 8-2 (v. John Part)
 Biggest defeat: 1-8 (v. James Wade)

Wayne Mardle 
 Longest unbeaten run: 5
 Most consecutive wins: 4
 Most consecutive draws: 1
 Most consecutive losses: 3
 Longest without a win: 6
 Biggest victory: 8-5 (v. Terry Jenkins, v. Raymond van Barneveld, v. Peter Manley and v. John Part)
 Biggest defeat: 0-8 (v. Phil Taylor)

Peter Manley 
 Longest unbeaten run: 3
 Most consecutive wins: 2
 Most consecutive draws: 2
 Most consecutive losses: 3
 Longest without a win: 5
 Biggest victory: 8-3 (v. Phil Taylor)
 Biggest defeat: 1-8 (v. Phil Taylor)

Terry Jenkins 
 Longest unbeaten run: 4
 Most consecutive wins: 3
 Most consecutive draws: 1
 Most consecutive losses: 3
 Longest without a win: 9
 Biggest victory: 8-2 (v. John Part)
 Biggest defeat: 1-8 (v. Raymond van Barneveld)

John Part 
 Longest unbeaten run: 1
 Most consecutive wins: 1
 Most consecutive draws: 1
 Most consecutive losses: 4
 Longest without a win: 4
 Biggest victory: 8-5 (v. Peter Manley and v. Terry Jenkins)
 Biggest defeat: 2-8 (v. Terry Jenkins and v. Adrian Lewis)

References

External links 
 PDC confirm 2008 – 2010 Premier League
 Fixtures 2008 planetdarts

Premier League Darts
Premier League Darts
Premier League Darts